WBKB-TV (channel 11) is a television station in Alpena, Michigan, United States, affiliated with CBS, NBC, ABC, Fox and MyNetworkTV. It serves as the flagship television property of The Marks Group. WBKB-TV's studios are located on North Bagley Street in Alpena, and its transmitter is located in unincorporated Alcona County (near M-72) south of Hubbard Lake.

WBKB is the only commercial over-the-air television station in one of the smallest media markets in the United States; the Alpena market consists of Alpena and Alcona counties, and is the third smallest media market in the United States. The station shares the market with the cable-only CW+ affiliate Alpena CW, which is controlled by local cable provider Charter Spectrum and offers limited local advertising, along with WCML, a PBS member station which is a satellite of Mount Pleasant-based WCMU-TV.

History
Thunder Bay Broadcasting Corporation was formed in the State of Michigan in September 1971 by Thomas Scanlan, a U.S. Air Force Captain stationed in Indianapolis, for the express purpose of establishing a commercial television station in Alpena, Michigan. At the time Alpena and its surrounding area was one of the last places in the Eastern United States without any over-the-air television service, as defined by the Federal Communications Commission (FCC). Such areas were called 'white areas'. Scanlan had just completed a tour of duty in Germany, where he and three other active-duty airmen, Thomas Disinger, S. Peter Neumann and Curtis Smith had been engaged in creating the first use of live satellite feeds to Europe of events specifically targeted to military personnel stationed in Europe. This first use was the live Apollo XI moon walk and events surrounding it from blast off to touchdown.

Beside his stock and stock reserved for Disinger, Neumann and Smith, Scanlan sold off stock to 43 other stockholders, mostly residents of Alpena. Expectations were that the permit would be granted and the station could be on the air by the summer of 1972, most likely as an ABC affiliate. On November 22, 1971, a competing application was filed for Channel 11 by a group headed by cable operator Bruce Freel. Freel's North American Broadcasting Company specified a much larger coverage area than that applied for by Scanlan, with a  tower near Millersburg, and coverage extending well to the west of Interstate 75. To maximize its opportunity to receive a grant in the event the FCC designated the two applications for a hearing, Scanlan amended the Thunder Bay application in 1972 to specify a shared tower with Alpena's non-commercial WCML-TV channel 6. With both Freel's and Scanlan's group applying for facilities that would duplicate, to a small degree, that of Traverse City's WGTU, Channel 29, the President of WGTU, Thomas Kiple, urged his group, Northern Entertainment, to ask the FCC to invoke their "UHF Impact Policy" on the applications. The UHF Impact Policy is no longer active, but at the time, 1972, the FCC would entertain applications to limit, or deny applications from proposed VHF facilities seeking new or improved facilities that would duplicate existing or planned UHF coverage.

At this same time Freel's group was facing mounting expenses in his cable and real estate businesses, and Freel offered to sell out to Scanlan's group for its out-of-pocket expenses, which the FCC approved almost immediately. This would allow Thunder Bay to proceed with its construction. Within a matter of weeks Northern Entertainment filed its UHF Impact Request with the FCC.

This action set in motion a competitive posture between Thunder Bay and Northern Entertainment. This reduced the percentage of overlap with WGTU's signal to 4.7%. On July 19, 1974, the FCC set aside Northern's objections and granted Thunder Bay its permit. Construction began that September.

WBKB-TV finally signed-on September 22, 1975, broadcasting on channel 11 from a transmitter at its studios on North Bagley Street.  It was the first of two stations in Alpena to sign-on that year (WCMU-TV would sign-on satellite station WCML in November). The station has always been a CBS affiliate. In 1982 Scanlan's group sold controlling interest in Thunder Bay to Stephen Marks of Maryland.

After the switch to digital-only broadcasting on June 12, 2009, WBKB-TV moved its digital signal, formerly on channel 13, to channel 11. WBKB-TV signed-on a new second digital subchannel to serve as the area's primary Fox and secondary MyNetworkTV affiliate that November. Until that point, Cadillac's WFQX-TV had been serving as the default Fox affiliate, operating a translator in Alpena, W31BO (channel 31), between 1996 and 2005. In addition, WFQX's full-powered satellite WFUP in Vanderbilt served areas around greater Alpena although not in the city proper.

Despite the existence of WBKB-TV's Fox channel, Charter systems still carry WFQX in standard and high definition to this day. MyNetworkTV can also still be seen in the market on Spectrum through Bay City's WNEM-DT2. That outlet served as the area's default MyNetworkTV outlet since the service signed-on back in September 2006.

On January 14, 2013, WBKB-TV added a new third digital subchannel to be the area's ABC affiliate, returning over-the-air ABC service to Alpena for the first time since WGTU translator K55AW (channel 55) left the air in the mid-1970s. In the interim, WJRT-TV in Flint served as the market's default affiliate on Charter with standard and high definition feeds.

On January 24, 2022, WBKB announced on their Facebook page that WBKB-DT2 would be joining NBC. The change took effect the next day, giving the Alpena market its first NBC affiliate and NBC in-market affiliates in all 210 Nielsen DMA's. Fox and MyNetworkTV were moved to a new fourth subchannel with the change. Prior to this, WTOM-TV in Cheboygan, a satellite of WPBN-TV in Traverse City, had served the Alpena area on cable.

Legacy of WBKB callsign
The WBKB call letters originally belonged (from 1946 until 1953) to channel 4 in Chicago. That station was owned by the Balaban and Katz Broadcasting subsidiary of Paramount Pictures and is now CBS owned-and-operated station WBBM-TV. WBKB then transferred to Chicago's ABC owned-and-operated station on channel 7 from 1953 to 1968 until it was renamed WLS-TV.

Programming

WBKB-TV
WBKB-TV's main channel clears the entire CBS schedule. Syndicated programming on WBKB-TV includes Wheel of Fortune, Jeopardy!, Live with Kelly and Ryan and The Jennifer Hudson Show.

WBKB-DT2
WBKB-DT2 clears most of the NBC schedule. Syndicated programming on WBKB-DT2 includes Pictionary, The People's Court, Dateline and Chicago Fire.

WBKB-DT3
WBKB-DT3 clears most of the ABC schedule, except for Weekend Adventure; WBKB-DT3 instead relies on the open syndication market for E/I compliant programming. WBKB-DT3 also serves as the local outlet of the Detroit Lions Television Network, carrying the Lions' preseason football games and their coach's show. Syndicated programming on WBKB-DT3 includes Rachael Ray, The Kelly Clarkson Show and Judge Judy.

WBKB-DT4
WBKB-DT4 clears most of the Fox schedule, but like WBKB-DT3, preempts Xploration Station in favor of E/I compliant programming from the open market. WBKB-DT4 also clears the entire MyNetworkTV schedule which airs immediately following Fox's prime time lineup. Syndicated programming on WBKB-DT4 includes Entertainment Tonight, Inside Edition and Maury.

Newscasts
Shortly after Stephen Marks acquired WBKB, newscasts known as UGN News (with "UGN" meaning "Upper Great (Lakes) Network") began to be simulcast with WBKP/WBUP in Marquette. Likewise, the programs featured regional news and weather coverage from the entire Upper and Northern Lower Peninsulas. In 2006, UGN News was re-focused to the Upper Peninsula and only originated from WBKP/WBUP. Currently, WBKB only airs local news weeknights at 6 and every night at 11 ET. All on-air personnel at the station perform "one-man-band" journalism duties such as shooting video, editing coverage, and producing the newscasts. In an interim period until the hire of a new meteorologist in 2022, it contracted with Cadillac-based NewsNet to provide its weather forecasts.

With the addition of ABC programming to its third digital subchannel, WBKB finally launched its first ever weekday morning show (as of February 2013), which also simulcasts on its NBC channel. The nightly newscasts are simulcast on WBKB's CBS, NBC and ABC channels, with the show tape-delayed on a network feed if a show or event runs long. In March 2019, the station upgraded their news operation to high definition, among the last in the United States to do so.

Subchannels
The station's digital signal is multiplexed:

11.1 and 11.2 are presented in 1080i full high definition over-the-air and over Dish, while 11.3 and 11.4 are in a standard definition widescreen format for local news, network and syndicated programming meant for high-definition broadcast. Spectrum provides the 11.3 and 11.4 subchannels in the 720p formats preferred by ABC and Fox, on channels 782 and 786, respectively.

References

External links
Official website

Television channels and stations established in 1975
1975 establishments in Michigan
BKB-TV
ABC network affiliates
CBS network affiliates